Hor also known as Huo'er is a township in Burang County, Ngari Prefecture the Tibet Autonomous Region of China; by the shore of Lake Manasarovar. It was placed in the back on the main East-West highway that followed the Silk Road from Lhasa to Kashmir.

References

Populated places in Ngari Prefecture
Township-level divisions of Tibet